The 27th Buil Film Awards ceremony was hosted by the Busan-based daily newspaper Busan Ilbo. The ceremony was held on October 5, 2018.

Winners and nominees
Complete list of nominees and winner:

(Winners denoted in bold)

References

External links
 

2018 film awards
Buil Film Awards
2018 in South Korean cinema
October 2018 events in South Korea